Samuel Booth may refer to:
 Samuel B. Booth, bishop of the Episcopal Diocese of Vermont
 Samuel Booth (politician), mayor of Brooklyn
 Sam Booth, Scottish footballer
 Samuel Booth, father of William Booth, founder of the Salvation Army